Palagano is a comune (municipality) in the Province of Modena in the Italian region Emilia-Romagna, located about  southwest of Bologna and about  southwest of Modena.

The municipality of Palagano contains the frazioni (subdivisions, mainly villages and hamlets) Boccassuolo, Costrignano, Monchio, Savoniero, and Susano.

Palagano borders the following municipalities: Frassinoro, Lama Mocogno, Montefiorino, Polinago, Prignano sulla Secchia, Riolunato, Toano.

Demographic evolution

Twin towns
Palagano is twinned with:

  Carqueiranne, France

References

External links
 www.comune.palagano.mo.it/

Cities and towns in Emilia-Romagna